Rhythm Parade is a 1942 American musical comedy film starring Gale Storm and Margaret Dumont.

Carl Foreman wrote the original story. Yvonne de Carlo makes an early appearance.

Cast
 Nils Granlund as himself, Nils T. "Granny" Granlund aka N.T.G.
 Gale Storm as Sally Benson
 Robert Lowery as Jimmy Trent
 Margaret Dumont as Ophelia MacDougal
 The Mills Brothers as themselves
 Ted Fio Rito as Orchestra leader
 Candy Candedo as Candy
 Chick Chandler as Speed
 Cliff Nazarro as Rocks MacDougal
 Jan Wiley as Connie

Home media
The film was released on DVD on September 25, 2018.

References

External links
Rhythm Parade at TCMDB
Rhythm Parade at IMDb

1942 films
1942 musical comedy films
Monogram Pictures films
Films directed by Howard Bretherton
American musical comedy films
American black-and-white films
1940s English-language films
1940s American films